This is a list of marae (Māori meeting grounds) in the Wellington Region of New Zealand.

Masterton District

Carterton District

South Wairarapa District

Kapiti Coast District

Porirua City

Lower Hutt City

Wellington City

See also
 Lists of marae in New Zealand
 List of schools in the Wellington Region
 Tapu Te Ranga Marae

References

Wellington Region, List of marae in the
Marae
Marae in the Wellington Region, List of